Denis Bochl (born 30 August 1993) is a Croatian professional footballer who most notably played for ViOn Zlaté Moravce as a forward.

Club career
Bochl was regarded as a big talent when playing for Ivančica and after a season in Croatia's third and fourth tier left for Slovakia in summer 2015.

FC ViOn Zlaté Moravce
He made his professional debut for FC ViOn Zlaté Moravce against ŠK Slovan Bratislava on 19 July 2015.

References

External links
 Futbalnet profile
 Fortuna Liga profile
 

1993 births
Living people
Sportspeople from Varaždin
Association football forwards
Croatian footballers
FC ViOn Zlaté Moravce players
Second Football League (Croatia) players
Slovak Super Liga players
Croatian expatriate footballers
Croatian expatriate sportspeople in Slovakia
Expatriate footballers in Slovakia